This article contains a list of voice actors who worked on the animated series Gargoyles.

Regular cast members
Voice actors in Gargoyles were credited only for episodes in which they appeared, with the most frequent credits going to those actors voicing the protagonists of the series and their most prominent enemies.

Recurring cast members

Guest stars

Star Trek connection
A number of voice actors for the show were starring actors in various Star Trek series:
Marina Sirtis (Deanna Troi on The Next Generation)
Jonathan Frakes (William Riker on The Next Generation)
Kate Mulgrew (Kathryn Janeway on Voyager)
Michael Dorn (Worf on The Next Generation and Deep Space Nine)
Brent Spiner (Data on The Next Generation)
LeVar Burton (Geordi La Forge on The Next Generation)
Colm Meaney (Miles O'Brien on The Next Generation and Deep Space Nine)
Avery Brooks (Benjamin Sisko on Deep Space Nine)
Nichelle Nichols (Uhura on Star Trek)

Many also appeared as guests in Star Trek at one time or another:
Salli Richardson (Nidell in "Second Sight")
John Rhys-Davies (Leonardo da Vinci on Voyager)
Frank Welker (Voices of Spock screaming in Star Trek III, and the alien creature in "Nothing Human")
Clancy Brown (Zobral in "Desert Crossing")
Matt Frewer (Berlingoff Rasmussen in "A Matter of Time")
James Saito (Lt. Nogami in "The 37’s")
W. Morgan Sheppard (Ira Graves in "The Schizoid Man", Qatai in "Bliss", the Klingon warden in Star Trek VI: The Undiscovered Country, and a science minister in the 2009 Star Trek film)
Michael Bell (Zorn in "Encounter at Farpoint", Borum in "The Homecoming", and Drofo Awa in "The Maquis")
Gerrit Graham (Hunter in "Captive Pursuit", and Quinn in "Death Wish")
David Warner (St. John Talbot in Star Trek V: The Final Frontier, Gorkon in Star Trek VI, and Gul Madred in "Chain of Command")
Diedrich Bader (Tactical Officer in "The Emissary")
Robert Ito (Lt. Chang in ‘’Coming of Age’’, and John Kim in ‘’Author, Author’’)
Clyde Kusatsu (Vice Admiral Nakamura on The Next Generation)
Paul Winfield (Clark Terrell in Star Trek II and Dathon in "Darmok")
Tony Jay (Minister Campio in "Cost of Living")
James L. Avery, Sr. (General K'Vagh in "Affliction")

Patrick Stewart (Jean-Luc Picard on The Next Generation) was also considered for a role in the series, but his representation turned down the offer because his usual fees could not be met.

Creator Greg Weisman has commented that, at first, this phenomenon was unintentional. Marina Sirtis and Jonathan Frakes were both cast in prominent roles, and quickly the directors and producers began to think of other Star Trek actors when casting new roles.

This "Star Trek connection" was given a nod to by script writers in at least one instance within the cartoon. In the episode "Her Brother's Keeper" (1x12), Brooklyn remarks: "Yeah? You and what Starfleet?"

References

Gargoyles
Gargoyles
Cast Members
Lists of voice actors by series